This is a list of awards and nominations received by Lim Young-woong, a South Korean trot, ballad and pop singer, entertainer and YouTuber, since his debut in 2016.


Awards and nominations

Other accolades

State honors

Listicles

Notes

References

Lists of awards received by South Korean musician